Acrosticta profunda is a species of ulidiidae or picture-winged fly in the genus Acrosticta of the family Ulidiidae.

References

Acrosticta
Insects described in 1909